Petrina Price (born 26 April 1984) is an Australian high jumper.

Price was born in Greenacre. She finished seventh at the 2000 World Junior Championships, won the silver medal at the 2001 World Youth Championships and the bronze medal at the 2002 World Junior Championships, and finished ninth at the 2006 Commonwealth Games. She also competed at the 2004 IAAF World Indoor Championships, the 2004 Olympic Games and the 2010 World Indoor Championships without reaching the final.

Her personal best jump is 1.94 metres, achieved in August 2009 in Cottbus.

References

1984 births
Living people
Australian female high jumpers
Athletes (track and field) at the 2004 Summer Olympics
Olympic athletes of Australia
Athletes (track and field) at the 2006 Commonwealth Games
Commonwealth Games competitors for Australia
People from New South Wales
World Athletics Championships athletes for Australia
20th-century Australian women
21st-century Australian women